Thomas Fenton is an American screenwriter and his writing credits include the screenplays for Saw IV.

Fenton grew up in Rochester, New York. His 5th grade had a movie-making class, where he's made some student sci-fi, horror and martial arts films. He attended Hofstra University and took film classes there on Long Island. Fenton started as a grip and best boy in New York City. Fenton opened and operated a production company doing commercial and music video production in New York. Fenton later moved to Hollywood switching to screenwriter and also working as a graphic novelist. Fenton's first break in Hollywood was doing a rewrite on Belly of the Beast by Stephen Seagal. Fenton wrote Dominion a graphic novel about Earthbound Angel. Fenton worked with Twisted Pictures on a number of films, best known as Saw IV. Fenton wrote the script for the film on Myrtles Plantation. Fenton then wrote scripts for some CineTel Films, including I Spit On Your Grave 2. Fenton spent years working with late producer Robert Evans at Paramount Pictures and does what many believe is one of the best impressions of Evans.

In 2018, Fenton wrote The Scream Writer's Handbook that is considered one of the better books on screenwriting. While continuing to write and direct, Fenton founded Workingscreenwriter.com his online teaching portal.

Filmography
Lady in White (1988) (Video Playback Operator)
Cheap Shots (1989) (Grip)
Slaughter of the Innocents (1993) (Grip)
Night Trap (1993) (Cast/Key Grip)
Double Dragon (1994) (Grip) 
Striking Point (1995) (Director/Writer/Editor) 
Halloween 4: Final Cut (2001) (Additional Photographer) 
Seraph (2002) (Writer)
Belly of the Beast (2004) (Draft)
Max Payne (2005) (Draft)
Saw IV (2007) (Story)
Myrtles Plantation (2007) (Writer)
Zombies Vs Robots (2007) (Treatment)
Terminated (2009) (Writer)
DeLorean (2010) (Writer)
Chain Letter (2010) (Draft)
Dominion (graphic novel) (2011) (Writer)
City At Midnight (2012) (Writer)
I Spit on Your Grave 2 (2013) (Writer)
Slay Per View (2016) (Writer)

External links 
 

American male screenwriters
Living people
Year of birth missing (living people)